Marcel "Sal" Frederick (April 17, 1926 – September 24, 2012) was an American businessman and politician.

Frederick was born in Mankato, Minnesota and graduated from Mankato High School in 1944. He served in the United States Army during World War II. Fredrick was one of the founders of the Happy Chef restaurant chain. He served in the Minnesota House of Representatives from 1985 to 1992 and was a Republican. He died in Mankato, Minnesota.

Notes

1926 births
2012 deaths
People from Mankato, Minnesota
Military personnel from Minnesota
Businesspeople from Minnesota
Republican Party members of the Minnesota House of Representatives
20th-century American businesspeople
United States Army personnel of World War II